The blackspotted puffer (Arothron nigropunctatus), also known as the dog-faced puffer, is a tropical marine fish belonging to the family Tetraodontidae.

Description
Arothron nigropunctatus is a small sized fish which grows up to  length. Its body is oval shape, spherical and relatively elongated. The skin is not covered with scales. The fish has no pelvic fin and no lateral line. The dorsal fin and the anal fin are small, symmetric and located at the end of the body. Its snout is short with two pairs of nostrils and its mouth is terminal with four strong teeth.

The background coloration is variable and can be grey, light brown, bluish, bluish dark, bright yellow, orangey yellow and also sometimes bi-color like bluish and yellow. Dark coloration occurs around the eyes and the mouth. The skin is strewed with dark blotches which vary in size and shape.

Distribution and habitat
This species is found in tropical waters from the Indian Ocean to the central islands of the Pacific Ocean, roughly equalling the Indo-Pacific, except the Red Sea. It lives close to external reef slopes and lagoons from the surface to  depth.

Feeding
Arothron nigropunctatus feeds on benthic invertebrates, sponges, algaes, coral like Acropora tips, crustaceans and mollusks.

Behaviour
This pufferfish is diurnal, solitary and territorial.

Potential danger
Arothron nigropunctatus holds the deadly poison tetrodotoxin, which protect it from predators. In order to ward off potential enemies, they can inflate their bodies by swallowing air or water.

References

External links
 

Arothron
Fish of Palau
Fish described in 1801